Stefano Sauli (died 1649) was a Roman Catholic prelate who served as Archbishop of Chieti (1638–1649).

Biography
Stefano Sauli was born in 1649.
On 10 November 1638, he was appointed during the papacy of Pope Urban VIII as Archbishop of Chieti.
On 21 November 1638, he was consecrated bishop by Alessandro Cesarini (iuniore), Cardinal-Deacon of Sant'Eustachio, with Alfonso Gonzaga, Titular Archbishop of Rhodus, and Tommaso Carafa, Bishop Emeritus of Vulturara e Montecorvino, serving as co-consecrators. 
He served as Archbishop of Chieti until his death in 1649.

References

External links and additional sources
 (for Chronology of Bishops) 
 (for Chronology of Bishops) 

17th-century Italian Roman Catholic archbishops
Bishops appointed by Pope Urban VIII
1649 deaths